Nicola Russo (born 8 October 1991) is an Italian footballer who plays as a midfielder for Fano.

Club career
Russo left for A.S. Andria BAT in January 2012 in temporary deal.

In summer 2012, Russo was signed by Parma after Taranto folded and the club sent Russo to Nocerina in co-ownership deal. In June 2013, Russo returned to Parma.

On 3 July 2013, Russo left for Gubbio.

On 11 July 2018, Russo joined Pescara.

On 13 September 2018, he joined Serie D club Aprilia on loan.

References

External links
 
 

1991 births
Sportspeople from Taranto
Footballers from Apulia
Living people
Italian footballers
Association football midfielders
Taranto F.C. 1927 players
S.S. Fidelis Andria 1928 players
A.S.G. Nocerina players
Parma Calcio 1913 players
A.S. Gubbio 1910 players
A.C.N. Siena 1904 players
L'Aquila Calcio 1927 players
A.S.D. Nocerina 1910 players
Delfino Pescara 1936 players
Vigor Lamezia players
Alma Juventus Fano 1906 players
Serie C players
Serie D players